Roi Kehat (or Roei Kaat, ; born 12 May 1992) is an Israeli footballer who plays as an attacking midfielder for Ironi Kiryat Shmona.

Club career

Maccabi Tel Aviv
Kahat began his career in the youth system of Maccabi Tel Aviv. At 2010–11 season he won with the youth team the double and finished the top league scorer (18 goals) along with his teammate Mu'nas Dabbur. On 15 February 2011 he made his debut for the senior team at the loss 0–1 to Hapoel Haifa. On 15 September 2011, he scored his debut senior team, at the loss 1–5 to Beşiktaş at the 2011–12 UEFA Europa League competition. Three days later scored his first goal in the Israeli Premier League during a 2–0 victory against Bnei Sakhnin.

Hapoel Be'er Sheva & Maccabi Yavne
At August 2012 was loaned to Hapoel Be'er Sheva until the end of the season. On 10 November 2012 he scored his debut goal for Be'er Sheva one minute after he came as a substitute against Hapoel Acre, and the game finished at draw 2-2. In summer 2013 was released from Maccabi Tel Aviv and signed to Maccabi Yavne from Liga Leumit.

Hapoel Ironi Kiryat Shmona
After half a season in Yavne, Kahat returned to the Premier League, when he signed to Hapoel Ironi Kiryat Shmona. He made his debut at the club On 13 January 2014 against his youth team, Maccabi Tel Aviv. By the end of the season scored 6 league goals Kahat in 19 appearances, and won at the Israel State Cup. At the end of the season was elected the young player of the year.

Austria Wien
On August 24, 2015, he signed in Austria Wien from Austrian Football Bundesliga.

Maccabi Haifa
On August 9, 2016, he signed for Israeli Premier League giants Maccabi Haifa, After passing a medical test, he signed a 3-year contract worth €250,000 per year.

International career
On 19 October 2011 he made his debut for Israel U21 in a friendly match against Ukraine. In November 2014 was called up to the Israeli senior team for the UEFA Euro 2016 qualifying game against Bosnia and Herzegovina but did not play. On 12 June, against the same opponents at the Stadion Bilino Polje in Zenica, he made his debut as an 80th-minute substitute for Nir Biton in a 1–3 defeat.

Honours

Club
Hapoel Ironi Kiryat Shmona
Israel State Cup - 2013–14

Individual
The young player of the season: 2013–14

Statistics
 As to 7 August 2022

References

External links

1992 births
Israeli Jews
Living people
Israeli footballers
Maccabi Tel Aviv F.C. players
Hapoel Be'er Sheva F.C. players
Maccabi Yavne F.C. players
Hapoel Ironi Kiryat Shmona F.C. players
FK Austria Wien players
Israeli Premier League players
Liga Leumit players
Austrian Football Bundesliga players
Footballers from Rehovot
Israel under-21 international footballers
Israel international footballers
Israeli expatriate footballers
Expatriate footballers in Austria
Israeli expatriate sportspeople in Austria
Association football midfielders